Gil Petmanis (born April 12, 1942) was a Canadian football player who played for the Toronto Argonauts, B.C. Lions, Hamilton Tiger Cats, and Saskatchewan Roughriders. He won the Grey Cup with Saskatchewan in 1966.

References

1942 births
Sportspeople from Riga
Saskatchewan Roughriders players
Living people
Canadian football defensive backs